Mihajlo Biberčić (born 23 September 1968) is a Serbian former professional footballer who played as a forward. He represented Yugoslavia U-16 in three games scoring once in 1985.

References

1968 births
Living people
Serbian footballers
Association football forwards
FK Radnički 1923 players
FK Borac Čačak players
FC Prishtina players
Mihajlo Bibercic
Mihajlo Bibercic
Mihajlo Bibercic
Stjarnan players
Serbian expatriate footballers
Serbian expatriate sportspeople in Iceland
Expatriate footballers in Iceland